Raj Bisram (born 1956) is a British antiques expert and auctioneer. He co-founded Bentley's Fine Art and Antiques Auction House in Cranbrook, Kent in 1995. He has appeared on several British TV programmes on antiques including Antiques Road Trip,  Flog It!, Four Rooms, Posh Pawn, Celebrity Antiques Road Trip, Bargain Hunt, and Would I Lie To You?.

Early life
He was born in London and named Rajkumar. He is of Indian descent. He attended Highgate School. He enlisted in the British Army where he became a physical training instructor in REME. He represented the British Army in competitive downhill skiing and the slalom. He qualified as an Austrian ski instructor and worked as a ski instructor in the resort of Ellmau in Tyrol. Bentley’s Antique & Fine Art Auctioneers was originally founded by Wilfred Wheaton and Raj in 1995 as Cranbrook Auction Rooms.

Personal life
He married Susan R Bisram (née Henley) in 1983. He has two adult daughters. His other interests include cooking, skiing, cricket and tennis along with bridge and poker in which he has won a tournament. He also loves magic and is a former member of the Magic Circle.

References

External links
Raj Bisram personal web-site
IMDB

Living people
English television presenters
Antiques experts
People from London
1956 births
BBC people
English auctioneers
English antiquarians
English television personalities
People educated at Highgate School